This is a list of notable people born in, or notable for their association with the U.S. state of Georgia.


Notable Georgians

0–9
 2 Chainz, rapper
 21 Savage; born in London, rapper

A

 Quinton Aaron, actor; born in New York City but raised in Augusta 
 Shareef Abdur-Rahim, basketball player
 James Abercrombie, congressman
Stacey Abrams, politician
 Ralph David Abernathy, civil rights leader; born in Alabama
 Brock Adams, politician, member of Congress representing Washington state and Secretary of Transportation under Jimmy Carter 
 Dianna Agron, actress, singer and dancer 
 Rhett Akins, singer
 Lauren Alaina, American Idol contestant
 Jason Aldean, country singer
 Cecil Alexander, architect 
 Edward Porter Alexander, Civil War general
 Margie Alexander, singer
 Dean Alford, politician
 Asher Allen, football player
 May Allison, actress
 Al-Farouq Aminu, basketball player
Alade Aminu (born 1987), Nigerian-American basketball player
 Joe Amisano, architect 
 Bill Anderson, singer; born in South Carolina
 Brooke Anderson, television personality
 George T. Anderson, Civil War general
 Nicole Gale Anderson, actress
 Robert H. Anderson, cavalry and artillery officer in the Confederate States Army during the Civil War
 Shandon Anderson, basketball player
 David Andrews, football player
 Edward Andrews, actor
 William Andrews, football player
 Luke Appling, baseball player; born in North Carolina
 Johnny Archer, billiards player
 Anthony J. Arduengo, III, chemist; born in Florida
 Robert Arrington, philosopher
 Lee Atwater, Republican political strategist
 Scott Aukerman, writer, actor, comedian
 Lisa Aukland, professional bodybuilder and powerlifter
 Tyler Austin, baseball player

B

 Lil Baby, rapper
 Jeff Backus, football player; born in Michigan
 Burke Badenhop, baseball player
 Allen Bailey, football player
 Champ Bailey, football player
 Abraham Baldwin, politician, founding father; born in Connecticut
 Alan Ball, screenwriter
 James Banks III (born 1998), basketball player
 Mary Ross Banks, litterateur, writer
 Ellison Barber, journalist 
 Cornelia Bargmann, neurobiologist; born in Virginia
 Chris Barnes, actor
 Harris Barton, All Pro NFL offensive lineman
 Francis S. Bartow, lawyer; politician
 Kim Basinger, actress
 Matt Battaglia, football player
 Jerome Preston Bates, actor
 Cullen A. Battle, Civil War general
 Brian Baumgartner, actor
 Alex W. Bealer, blacksmith
 Amanda Bearse, actress; born in Florida
 Vic Beasley, football player
 Matt Beaty, baseball player
 Gordon Beckham, baseball player
 Tim Beckham, baseball player
 Buck Belue, football player
 William Tapley Bennett Jr., Ambassador to the Dominican Republic 
 Henry L. Benning, Civil War general
 Anna Benson, model
 Kris Benson, baseball player; born in Wisconsin
 Fonzworth Bentley, musician
 Ben Bernanke, economist, chairman of the Federal Reserve
 Eric Berry, football player
 John Berry, singer; born in South Carolina
 Martha Berry, educator; born in Alabama
 Antoine Bethea, football player
 Erin Bethea, actress
 Justin Bieber, singer; born in Ontario
 John Birch, missionary, WWII intelligence officer; born in India
 Furman Bisher, sportswriter; born in North Carolina
 Norman Blake, musician; born in Tennessee
 Mary J. Blige, singer; born in New York City
 Darrell Blocker, nicknamed "The Spy Whisperer", CIA agent
 Ron Blomberg (born 1948), baseball player
Jaron Blossomgame (born 1993), basketball player in the Israeli Basketball Premier League
 Mel Blount, football player
 B.o.B, musician; record producer; born in North Carolina
 Eric A. Boe, space shuttle pilot; born in Florida
 Mitchell Boggs, baseball player
 Skye Bolt (born 1994), baseball player for the San Francisco Giants
 Casey Bond, actor, baseball player
 Julian Bond, politician and activist; born in Tennessee
 Eddie Bonine, baseball player
 Boondox, rapper
 Neal Boortz, radio personality; born in Pennsylvania
 Big Bossman, professional wrestler
 John S. Bowen, Civil War general
 Blaine Boyer, baseball player
 Brandon Boykin, football player
 Johanna Braddy, actress
 Deion Branch, football player
 Russell Branyan, baseball player
 Morgan Brian, soccer player; USWNT/Houston Dash midfielder
 June Brigman, comic book artist
 Jasper Brinkley, football player
 Keith Brooking, football player
 Marshon Brooks, basketball player; born in New Jersey
 Alton Brown, chef, television personality; born in California
 James Brown, singer; born in South Carolina
 Kane Brown, singer 
 Jim Brown, football player
 Joseph E. Brown, politician; born in South Carolina
 Kevin Brown, baseball player
 Kwame Brown, basketball player; born in South Carolina
 Reggie Brown, football player
 Ronnie Brown, football player
 Trenton Brown, football player
 Zac Brown, musician
 Jonathan Broxton, baseball player
 Goode Bryan, Civil War general
 Luke Bryan, musician
 Elijah Bryant (born 1995), basketball player in the Israeli Basketball Premier League
 Jason Bulger, baseball player
 Tituss Burgess, actor, singer
 Morgan Burnett, football player; born in Tennessee
 Billy Burns, baseball player
 M. Michele Burns, businesswoman
 Kandi Burruss, singer, actress
 Denise Burse, actress
 Frank Bush, football player
 Brice Butler, football player
 Drew Butler, football player
 James Butler, football player
 Byron Buxton, baseball player
 Dan Byrd, actor
 Elia Goode Byington, journalist
 Marlon Byrd, baseball player; born in Florida
 Thomas Jefferson Byrd, actor

C

 

 Herman Cain, politician
 Lorenzo Cain, baseball player
 Craig Campbell, singer
 Mike Cameron, baseball player
 Asa Griggs Candler, businessman; Mayor of Atlanta
 Matt Capps, baseball player
 Jaime Cardriche, actor
 Jean Carne, singer
 James Carpenter, football player
 Anthony Carter, basketball player; born in Wisconsin
 Jimmy Carter, Governor of Georgia; 39th President of the United States
 Joelle Carter, model
 Lorenzo Carter, football player
 Robert Carter (born 1994), basketball player in the Israeli Basketball Premier League
 Rosalynn Carter, First Lady of the United States
 S. Truett Cathy, founder of Chick-fil-A
 Playboi Carti, rapper
 Michael Catt, clergyman
 Dylan Cease (born 1995), Major League Baseball pitcher
 The Lady Chablis, Savannah personality; born in Florida
 Hosea Chanchez, actor; born in Alabama
 Kyle Chandler, actor; born in New York
 Spud Chandler, baseball player
 Mark David Chapman, convicted murderer; born in Texas
 Matt and Mike Chapman; animators and voice actors; born in Indiana
 Ray Charles, singer
 Ben Chestnut, entrepreneur
 Ciara (Ciara Harris), singer, model
 Tashard Choice, football player
 Chris Clemons, football player
 Howell Cobb, Governor of Georgia; U.S. Secretary of Treasury; Speaker of the United States House of Representatives
 Ty Cobb, baseball player
 Charles Coburn, actor
 Jackie Cochran, musician
 Erle Cocke Jr. (1921–2000), 33rd National Commander of the American Legion
 Justin Coleman, football player
 Kevin Cone, football player
 Chris Conley, football player; born in Turkey
 Frances Conroy, actress
 Pat Conroy, author
 Clay Cook, songwriter
 Jared Cook, football player; born in Alabama
 Michael Cranford, software engineer
 Harry Crews, author
 Charles Crisp, U.S. Representative; born in England
 Javaris Crittenton, basketball player
 David Cross, actor
 Curtis Crowe, drummer
 Charlie Culberson, baseball player
 Brandon Cumpton, baseball player
 Jermaine Cunningham, football player; born in New York City
 Billy Currington, musician
 Bill Curry, football player, coach
 Michael Curry, basketball player; born in Alabama

D
 

 Jeff Daniels, actor
 Elizabeth Otis Dannelly, poet
 Patrika Darbo, actress; born in Florida
 Kyle Davies, baseball player
 Austin Davis, football player
 Brianne Davis, actress
 Geremy Davis, football player
 Jack Davis, cartoonist
 Jamin Davis, football player
 Ossie Davis, actor
 Raymond Gilbert Davis, Korean War Medal of Honor recipient
 Thomas Davis, football player
 Troy Davis, convicted murderer
 William Crosby Dawson, judge
 Diana DeGarmo, singer
 Paula Deen, chef and television personality
 Akeem Dent, football player
 Bucky Dent, baseball player
 Richard Dent, football player
 Delino DeShields Jr., baseball player; born in Maryland
 Noureen DeWulf, actress
 James Dickey, author and poet
 Lella A. Dillard, temperance leader
 Marcus Dixon, football player
 Demarcus Dobbs, football player
 Amanda Doherty, golfer
 Gigi Dolin, professional wrestler
 Creflo Dollar, televangelist
 Melvyn Douglas, actor
 Toney Douglas, basketball player
 Kenyan Drake, football player
 J. D. Drew, baseball player
 Stephen Drew, baseball player
 Jermaine Dupri, music producer
 William DuVall, musician
 Jonathan Dwyer, football player
 Pat Dye, football coach

E

 Bobbie Eakes, actress
 Nick Eason, professional football defensive end
 Sam Edwards, actor
 Teresa Edwards, basketball player
 Terrence Edwards, Canadian football player
 Dwight D. Eisenhower, 34th President of the United States
 Jason Elam, professional football placekicker; born in Florida
 Chase Elliott, NASCAR driver
 Bill Elliott, NASCAR driver
 Jeri Ellsworth, computer chip designer
 Corri English, actress
 Ellia English, actress
 eLDee, Musician, Record label executive
 Evan Engram, professional football player
 Mike Erwin, actor
 Clement A. Evans, Civil War general
 Maria Louise Eve, poet
 Adam Everett, former MLB shortstop

F

 Dakota Fanning, actress
 Elle Fanning, actress
 Kyle Farnsworth, baseball player; born in Kansas
 Harris Faulkner, television personality
 Derrick Favors, basketball player
 Jennifer Ferrin, actress
 William Few, politician, founding father
 Josh Fields, baseball player
 Chone Figgins, baseball player
 Howard Finster, minister
 Laurence Fishburne, actor
Anthony Fisher (born 1986), basketball player in the Israeli Basketball Premier League
 Tyler Flowers, baseball player
 Pretty Boy Floyd, bank robber
 Andre Fluellen, football player; born in Pennsylvania
 Tom Foley, baseball player
 Colt Ford, musician
 Ira Roe Foster, soldier and politician; born in South Carolina
 Dexter Fowler, baseball player
 Keyaron Fox, football player
 Rachel G. Fox, actress
 Jeff Foxworthy, comedian
 Jeff Francoeur, baseball player
 Clint Frazier, baseball player
 Walt Frazier, basketball player
 Devonta Freeman, football player
 John C. Fremont, explorer, politician
 Future, rapper

G

 
 Kap G, rapper and actor
 Boyd Gaines, actor
 Michael Gallup, football player
 Darryl Gamble, football player
 John Gant, baseball player
 Max Garcia, football player
 Andrew Gardner, football player
 Willie Gault, football player
 Josh Gibson, baseball player
 Kelli Giddish, actress
 Brantley Gilbert, singer
 Kevin Gillespie, chef, restaurateur, and author 
 Newt Gingrich, politician, historian, former Speaker of the House, and Presidential candidate 
 De'Mon Glanton, football player
 Cordy Glenn, football player
 Donald Glover, actor and rapper; born in California
 Jonathan Goff, football player
 Walton Goggins, actor; born in Alabama
 Kedric Golston, football player
 John Brown Gordon, Civil War general
 Marianne Gordon, actress
 Terrance Gore, baseball player
 Andrew Goudelock, basketball player
 Joyce Grable, professional wrestler
 Nancy Grace, television personality
 Amy Grant, singer
 Deon Grant, football player
 Cee Lo Green, singer
 Willie Green, football player
 Kevin Greenaugh, scientist
 Nathanael Greene, American Revolutionary War general
 James Gregory, comedian
 Simone Griffeth, actress
 Forrest Griffin, martial artist; born in Ohio
 Marquis Grissom, baseball player
 Lewis Grizzard, writer
 Ben Grubbs, football player
 Gunna, rapper 
 Jim Gurfein (born 1961), tennis player
 Jasmine Guy, actress
 Gary Guyton, football player
 Myron Guyton, football player
 Button Gwinnett, 18th-century politician; born in England

H

 David Hale, baseball player
 Grant Haley, football player
 Todd Haley, football coach
 Chad Hall, football player
 Lyman Hall, 18th-century statesman
 Mary Crovatt Hambidge (1885–1973), artist, weaver
 Eric L. Haney, Delta Force military figure
 John Hannah, football player
 Omari Hardwick, actor
 Oliver Hardy, actor
 Gale Harold, actor
 Ken "The Hawk" Harrelson, TV announcer for the Chicago White Sox 
 Desmond Harrington, actor
 Don Harris, journalist
 Dwayne Harris, football player
 Ethel Hillyer Harris, author
 Joel Chandler Harris, journalist; folklorist; wrote the collection of Uncle Remus stories
 Josh Harris, football player
 Nancy Hart, American Revolutionary War figure
 Ernie Harwell, baseball broadcaster
 Vanessa Briscoe Hay, singer
 Jarvis Hayes, basketball player
 Roland Hayes, singer
 Garrison Hearst, football player
 Lucille Hegamin, singer
 Will Heller, football player
 Ed Helms, actor
 Elaine Hendrix, actress
 Chas Henry, football player
 Jeremy Hermida, baseball player
 J. G. Hertzler, actor, author, screenwriter
 Clint Hester, mixed martial artist 
 Cameron Heyward, football player; born in Pennsylvania
 Bill Hicks, comedian
 J. J. Hickson, basketball player
 Daniel Whitehead Hicky, poet
 Jordan Hill, basketball player
 Keri Hilson, singer
 Elijah Hirsh (born 1997), American-Israeli basketball player in the Israeli Basketball Premier League
 Hulk Hogan, wrestler and actor
 Doc Holliday, American Old West figure
 Josh Holloway, actor; model; born in California
 Sterling Holloway, actor
 Larry Holmes, boxer
 Lucius Henry Holsey, bishop
 Evander Holyfield, boxer
 Rick Honeycutt, baseball player, coach; born in Tennessee
 Jan Hooks, actress
 Miriam Hopkins, actress
Chris Horton (born 1994), basketball player for Hapoel Tel Aviv of the Israeli Basketball Premier League
 Corinne Stocker Horton, elocutionist, journalist, newspaper editor
 Justin Houston, football player
 William Houstoun, lawyer
 Dwight Howard, basketball player
Richard Howell (born 1990), American-Israeli basketball player in the Israeli Basketball Premier League
 Tim Hudson, baseball player
 Holly Hunter, actress
 Caleb Lee Hutchinson, singer and runner-up on American Idols 16th season

I
 Tommy Irvin, longest-serving state Commissioner of Agriculture in U.S.
 Dana Ivey, actress
 Mike Ivie, baseball player

J

 Beau Jack, boxer
 Alan Jackson, musician
 Edwin Jackson, baseball player; born in West Germany
 Kareem Jackson, football player
 Keith Jackson, sportscaster
 Millie Jackson, singer
 Emily Jacobson (born 1985), saber fencer
 Sada Jacobson (born 1983), Olympic fencing silver and bronze medalist 
 Bernard James, basketball player
 Brian Girard James, professional wrestler
 Ja'Wuan James, football player
 Marty Jannetty, professional wrestler
 Grady Jarrett, football player
 Erika Jayne, performer
 E. F. Jemison, Confederate soldier
 Chad Jenkins, baseball player; born in Tennessee
 George W. Jenkins, founder of Publix
 Iris Johansen, novelist
 Broderick Johnson, film producer
 Calvin Johnson (also known as Megatron), football player
 Charles Johnson, football player
 Hall Johnson, composer, arranger
 Herschel V. Johnson, politician
 Abry Jones, football player
 Adam "Pacman" Jones, football player
 Bobby Jones, golfer
 Chipper Jones, baseball player
 Chris Jones, football player
 Jonathan Jones, football player
 Nick Jones, football player
 Reshad Jones, football player
 Sean Jones, football player
 Ronald Jones II college football player USC Trojans
 Benn Jordan, electronic musician
 Wally Joyner, baseball player

K

 Vyto Kab, football player
 John Kasay, football placekicker
 Mammy Kate, slave; American Revolutionary War figure
 James Keach, actor
 Stacy Keach, actor
 Fanny Kemble, actress
 Brian Porter Kemp, 83rd and current governor
 Charles Kelley, singer
 DeForest Kelley, actor
 Michael Kelly, actor; born in Pennsylvania
 Walt Kelly, cartoonist
 Alex Kendrick, screenwriter
 Stephen Kendrick, screenwriter
 D. James Kennedy, pastor, Christian broadcaster
 Joe Kennedy, state senator
 Khalid, singer
 Todd Kimsey, actor
 Brandon King, football player
 Kaki King, musician
 Marquette King, football punter
 Martin Luther King Jr., civil rights leader
 Lucian Lamar Knight, historian
 Ray Knight, baseball player, manager
 Leo Kottke, musician

L

 Christine Lakin, actress; born in Texas
 Gazaway Bugg Lamar, businessman
 Mirabeau Lamar, Texas politician
 Jeremy Lamb, basketball player
 Sonny Landham, actor
 Brandon Lang, football player
 Sidney Lanier, poet and musician
 Latto, rapper
 Peter Lawler, academic
 Trevor Lawrence, football player
 Chuck Leavell, musician
 Brenda Lee, singer
 Spike Lee, filmmaker
 Ron Lester, actor
 John Lewis, politician
 Lil Baby, rapper
 Lil Jon, DJ; rapper; record producer
 Lil Nas X, rapper
 Lil Scrappy, rapper
 Lil Yachty, rapper
 Trevard Lindley, football player
 Hillary Lindsey, singer
 Samuel Little, serial killer
 Eric Lively, actor
 Robyn Lively, actress
 Natalia Livingston, actress
 Ricardo Lockette, football player
 Crawford Long, surgeon
 Helen Dortch Longstreet, newspaper editor, publisher
 James Longstreet, Civil War general; born in South Carolina
 Kyle Love, football player; born in South Korea
 Juliette Gordon Low, Girl Scouts founder
 Chris Lowell, actor
 Bill Lowery, music producer
 Jordan Loyd, basketball player
 Ludacris, rapper and actor
 Robert L. Lynn, poet

M

 William H. Macy, actor; born in Florida
 Lester Maddox, politician; Governor of Georgia
 Sam Madison, football player 
 Manuel Maloof, politician
 Gucci Mane, rapper; born in Alabama
 Patrick Mannelly, football player
 Jerry Manuel, baseball player and manager
 Stephen Mansfield, author
 Nick Markakis, baseball player; born in New York
 Chan Marshall, singer
 Nick Marshall, football player 
 Margaret Martin, professional bodybuilder
 Sam Martin, football player
 Jonathan Massaquoi, football player
 Kyle Massey, actor
 Clint Mathis, soccer player and coach
 Robert Mathis, football player
 Erskine Mayer (1889–1957), baseball player
 John Mayer, singer; born in Connecticut
 William McAdoo, politician; U.S. Secretary of the Treasury
 Jack McBrayer, actor
 Danny R. McBride, actor
 Brian McCann, baseball player
 Matt McClure, journalist, actor
 AnnaLynne McCord, actress
 Demetrius McCray, football player; born in California
 Carson McCullers, author
 Dustin McGowan, baseball player
 Curtis McGriff, football player
 Collin McHugh, baseball player
 William McIntosh, Native American chief
 Cynthia McKinney, U.S. Representative
 Ray McKinnon, actor
 Randy McMichael, football player
 Marcus McNeill, football player; born in Chicago
Jordan McRae (born 1991), basketball player for Hapoel Tel Aviv of the Israeli Basketball Premier League
 Blind Willie McTell, musician
 Austin Meadows, baseball player
 Jodie Meeks, basketball player; born in Tennessee
 Jesse Mercer, minister, educator; born in North Carolina
 Johnny Mercer, composer
 LaVon Mercer (born 1959), American-Israeli basketball player
 Jakobi Meyers, football player
 Tracy Middendorf, actress; born in Florida
 Bruce Miller, football player
 James C. Miller III, budget director for President Ronald Reagan
 Zell Miller, U.S. Senator from Georgia; Governor of Georgia
 Patrick Millsaps, Chief of Staff to Newt Gingrich's 2012 campaign for the Republican nomination; film and television producer
 Jeremy Mincey, football player
 Kevin Minter, football player
 E. Coppée Mitchell (1836–1887), professor and dean of the University of Pennsylvania Law School
 Malcolm Mitchell, football player
 Margaret Mitchell, author
 Sam Mitchell, basketball player
 Johnny Mize, baseball player
 Victoria Monét, singer and songwriter
 Monica, singer
 Joanna Moore, actress
 Kip Moore, singer
 Knowshon Moreno, football player
 Chloë Grace Moretz, actress
 Matthew David Morris, Youtuber, rapper
 Randolph Morris, basketball player; born in Texas
 Chesley V. Morton, stockbroker, State Representative; born in Florida
 Brandon Mosley, football player
 Brandon Moss, baseball player
 Elijah Muhammad, Muslim leader
 Shawn Mullins, singer
 Lenda Murray, IFBB professional bodybuilder; born in Michigan
 Lauren Myracle, author

N

 James Nabrit Jr., civil rights attorney
 Eric Nam, singer
 James Neill, silent film actor
 Susan Neiman, moral philosopher
 Steven Nelson, football player
 Jennifer Nettles, musician
 Daniel Newman, model and actor
 Fred Newman, actor
 Warren Newson, baseball player
 Cam Newton, football player
 Anne Nichols, playwright
 Nivea, singer
 Jessye Norman, singer
 Maidie Norman, actress
 Pettis Norman, football player
 Deborah Norville, television personality
 Sam Nunn, U.S. Senator

O

 Flannery O'Connor, author
 Eugene Odum, University of Georgia faculty member
 Offset, rapper; member of Migos
 James Oglethorpe, state founder; born in England
 Alec Ogletree, football player
 Kelley O'Hara, soccer player; USWNT/Washington Spirit defender
 Maude Andrews Ohl, journalist, poet, writer
 Michael Ola, football player
 Javianne Oliver, track and field sprinter
 Paul Oliver, football player
 Matt Olson, baseball player
 Elizabeth Omilami, activist
 Sean O'Pry, male supermodel
 Melissa Ordway, actress
 Jon Ossoff, US Senator
Monroe Owsley, actor

P

 Sean P, musician; member of Southern hip hop duo YoungBloodZ
 Harrison Page, actor
 Michael Palmer, football player
 Kay Panabaker, actress, zoologist
 Danielle Panabaker, actress
 Albert Parker, businessman
 Jim Parker, football player
 Bert Parks, singer and actor
 Gram Parsons, musician; born in Florida
 Patrick Pass, football player
 Robert Patrick, actor
 Corey Patterson, baseball player
 Eric Patterson, baseball player; born in Florida
Antwan "Big Boi" Patton, rapper; songwriter; record producer; actor
 E. Earl Patton, politician
 Jo Marie Payton, actress
 George Foster Peabody, banker and philanthropist
 Dr. John Stith Pemberton, inventor of Coca-Cola
 Richard Penniman aka Little Richard, musician
 Tyler Perry, actor, producer, director
 Ty Pennington, television personality (Extreme Makeover Home Edition, Trading Spaces)
 Madeleine Peyroux, jazz singer, songwriter
 William Pierce, white nationalist; physicist; writer
 Brandon Phillips, baseball player; born in North Carolina
 Dwight Phillips, long jumper
 Phillip Phillips, singer, winner of American Idol Season 11
 Mareno Philyaw, football player
 James Ponsoldt, director, actor, screenwriter
 Buster Posey, baseball player
 Pogo Possum, fictional character
 Mac Powell, singer, Third Day; born in Alabama
 Samantha Power, United States Ambassador to the United Nations; born in Ireland
 Harriet Powers, (1837–1910), African American slave quilt artist
 Robert Poydasheff, mayor of Columbus, Georgia
Alex Poythress (born 1993), American-Ivorian basketball player for Maccabi Tel Aviv of the Israeli Premier Basketball League
 Carrie Preston, actress
 Kazimierz Pułaski, nobleman; born in Poland; died in Savannah

Q
 Quando Rondo, rapper
 Quavo, rapper

R

 David Ragan, NASCAR driver
 Ma Rainey, blues singer
 Bacarri Rambo, football player
 Jeannette Rankin, first Congresswoman
 Rasheeda, rapper
 Colby Rasmus, baseball player
 Jeremiah Ratliff, football player; born in Florida
 Raven-Symoné, actress
 Amy Ray, singer
 Paul Rea, television journalist
 Blair Redford, actor
 Josh Reddick, baseball player
 Otis Redding, singer
 Jerry Reed, singer and actor
 Ralph Reed, political activist; born in Virginia
 Dan Reeves, football coach
 Marco Restrepo, musician
 Ben Revere, baseball player
 Thomas Rhett, singer
 Cody Rhodes, professional wrestler
 Little Richard, musician
 Latanya Richardson, actress
 Travis Richter, musician
 Jody Ridley, NASCAR driver
 Chandler Riggs, actor
 Perry Riley, football player
 Eric Roberts, actor
 Julia Roberts, actress
 Paul Craig Roberts, economist
 Pernell Roberts, actor
 Chris Robinson, singer
 Dunta Robinson, football player
 Jackie Robinson, baseball player
 Keith Robinson, actor; born in Kentucky
 Sugar Ray Robinson, boxer
 Bradley Roby, football player; born in Texas
 John Rocker, baseball player
 Tommy Roe, singer
 Carlos Rogers, football player
 Kenny Rogers, baseball player
 Scott Rogers, hiker
 Ed Roland, musician
 Franklin D. Roosevelt, U.S. President; born and raised in New York; had second home in Georgia and died there
 David Ross, baseball player
 Kelly Rowland, singer
 Billy Joe Royal, singer
Dean Rusk, U.S. Secretary of State
Richard Russell Jr., politician

S

 21 Savage, rapper; born in London
 Nolan Smith, artist; musician
 Ken Sagoes, actor
 Emily Saliers, singer
 Hannah Salwen, author
 Kevin Salwen, author
 Junior Samples, comedian
 B. B. Sams, artist; born in South Carolina
 Mackey Sasser, baseball player
 Jeff Saturday, football player
 Morgan Saylor, actress; born in Chicago
 Hal Scardino, actor
 Diana Scarwid, actress
 Mary Schmich, columnist
 Chris Scott, football player
 Lindsay Scott, football player
 Richard T. Scott, artist
 Ryan Seacrest, television personality, host of American Idol since 2002 and co-host of Live with Kelly and Ryan since 2017
 John H. Sengstacke, newspaper publisher
 Ken Shamrock, mixed martial artist
 Shannon Sharpe, football player and television commentator
 Sterling Sharpe, football player
 Shari Shattuck, actress
 Kelvin Sheppard, football player
 Sonny Shroyer, actor
 Philip T. Shutze, architect; born in Columbus 
 Silentó, rapper
 Louise Simonson, comic book author
 Harry Simpson, baseball player
 Lucas Sims, baseball player
 IronE Singleton, actor
 Darius Slay, football player
 Sam Sloman (born 1997), NFL football player
 Kyle Sloter, football player
 Corey Smith, musician
 Daryl Smith, football player
 Josh Smith, basketball player
 Lillian Smith, author
 Marcus Smith, football player
 Ron Clinton Smith, actor
 Telvin Smith, football player
 Josh Smoker, baseball player
 Jacob Snider, inventor
 Troy Snitker, baseball coach
 Steven Soderbergh, film director
 Emily Sonnett, soccer player; USWNT/Washington Spirit defender
 Reed Sorenson, NASCAR driver
 Moxley Sorrel, Civil War officer
 Soulja Boy, rapper; record producer; actor; born in Chicago
 Joe South, singer
 Southside, producer
 Takeo Spikes, football player
 Hollis Stacy, golfer
 Matthew Stafford, football player
 Laurence Stallings, playwright
 Kristian Stanfill, singer
 Brandon Stanton, blogger, photographer, founder of Humans of New York
 Alexander Stephens, Vice President of the Confederate States of America; member of the House of Representatives; Governor of Georgia
Amin Stevens (born 1990), basketball player in the Israeli Basketball Premier League
 Ray Stevens, singer
 Dani Stevenson, singer
 Michael Stipe, musician (R.E.M.)
 Missouri H. Stokes, social reformer, writer
 Doug Stone, singer
 Hunter Strickland, baseball player
 KaDee Strickland, actress
 Keith Strickland, composer; multi-instrumentalist; founding member of the new wave band The B-52s
 A.J. Styles, professional wrestler
 Louise Suggs, golfer
 Louis Wade Sullivan, educator; U.S. Secretary of Health and Human Services
 Dansby Swanson, baseball player
 Pat Swilling, football player
 Sunny Suljic, actor
 Bella French Swisher, writer, editor, publisher

T

 T.I., rapper
 Fran Tarkenton, football player; born in Virginia
Angelo Taylor: athlete, Olympic gold medalist, coach, suspended by SafeSport for sexual misconduct
 Cooper Taylor, football player
 Tut Taylor, musician
 Doug Teper, businessman and politician
 Bill Terry, baseball player
 Alma Thomas, painter
 Clarence Thomas, Associate Justice of the Supreme Court of the United States
 Demaryius Thomas, football player
 Frank Thomas, baseball player
 John Michael "Mickey" Thomas, singer
 Joshua Thomas, designer
 J. T. Thomas, football player
 Rozonda Thomas, singer
 Trey Thompkins, basketball player
 Juwan Thompson, football player; born in the U.S. Virgin Islands
 Kenan Thompson, comedian
 Cyndi Thomson, singer
 Al Thornton, basketball player
 Melanie Thornton, singer
 Young Thug, rapper
 Lucas Till, actor
Conrad Tillard (born 1964), politician, Baptist minister, radio host, author, and activist
 Dina Titus, Nevada congresswoman
 Mike Tolbert, football player
 Dalvin Tomlinson, football player
 Peter Tompkins, journalist, WWII spy
 Robert Toombs, Civil War general
 Gwen Torrence, athlete
 Travis Tritt, musician
 Torell Troup, football player; born in Michigan
 Pastor Troy, rapper
 Chris Tucker, actor
 Jessie Tuggle, football player
 Stephon Tuitt, football player; born in Florida
 Forrest Turner, prison reform advocate
 Henry Ashby Turner, historian
 DeAngelo Tyson, football player

U

Devonte Upson (born 1993), basketball player in the Israeli Basketball Premier League
 James L. Usry, mayor of Atlantic City

V

 Carlos Valdes, actor and singer
 Blake R. Van Leer, President of Georgia Tech, the first to admit women and fought against segregationist Governor Griffin
 Ella Lillian Wall Van Leer, American artist and architect, women's rights activist
 Fernando Velasco, football player; born in New York
 Carl Vinson, U.S. Representative, "father of the Two-Ocean Navy" 
 Lenny Von Dohlen, actor

W

 Adam Wainwright, baseball player
 Rick Waits, baseball player, pitching coach
 Waka Flocka Flame, rapper; born in New York City
 Erik Walden, football player
 Phil Walden, music producer
 Alice Walker, author
 Butch Walker, musician
 Greg Walker, baseball player
 Herschel Walker, football player
 Summer Walker, singer 
 Travon Walker, football player
 Aria Wallace, actress
 John Waller, musician
 Susan Walters, actress and model
 Hines Ward, football player; born in South Korea
 Matthias Ward, lawyer; U.S. Senator from Texas
 DJ Ware, football player
 Raphael Warnock, US Senator
Fredi Washington, actress
 Douglass Watson, actor
 James Moore Wayne, judge
 Keenan Webb, also known as DJ Suede the Remix God, music producer
 Spencer Wells, geneticist, anthropologist
 Devon Werkheiser, actor and musician
 John Wesley, Savannah theologian; born in the United Kingdom
 Allen West, politician
 Kanye West, recording artist; raised in Chicago, Illinois
 Mario West, basketball player; born in Alabama
 Jake Westbrook, baseball player
 Philip Wheeler, football player
 Zack Wheeler, baseball player
 Corey White, football player
 Mary Jarrett White, first woman to vote in the state of Georgia
 Charlie Whitehurst, football player; born in Wisconsin
 Steve Whitmire, puppeteer
 Eli Whitney, inventor; born in Massachusetts
 Laura Slade Wiggins, actress, singer, musician
 J. J. Wilcox, football player
 Dominique Wilkins, basketball player
 Gerald Wilkins, basketball player
 Ellis E. Williams, actor; comedian
 Gary Anthony Williams, comedian
 Louis Williams, basketball player; born in Tennessee
 Porsha Williams, TV personality
 Alicia Leigh Willis, actress
 Garry Wills, author, journalist, and historian
 Cindy Wilson, singer-songwriter; founding member of the new wave band The B-52s
 Ricky Wilson, guitarist; founding member of the new wave band The B-52s
 Scott Wilson, actor
 Woodrow Wilson, 28th President of the United States; raised in Augusta; practiced law in Atlanta
 Kitty Wilson-Evans, historical interpreter
 Blake Wood, baseball player
 Xavier Woods, professional wrestler
 Joanne Woodward, actress
 David McCord Wright, economist 
 Lizz Wright, singer
 Rayfield Wright, Pro Hall of Fame football player
 Will Wright, game designer
 Jarius Wynn, football player

Y

 Cassie Yates, actress 
 Sally Yates, U.S. Deputy Attorney General 
 Trisha Yearwood, singer
 Frank Yerby, writer 
 Ying Yang Twins, hip-hop duo (Kaine (born Eric Jackson) and D-Roc (born De'Angelo Holmes))
 Young Dro, rapper 
 Young Jeezy, rapper

See also

 List of people from Atlanta, Georgia
 List of people from Augusta, Georgia
 List of people from Savannah, Georgia
 List of United States representatives from Georgia
 List of United States senators from Georgia
 List of governors of Georgia
List of Georgia suffragists

References